The Legendsong Saga encompasses the novels Darkfall and Darksong written by Australian author Isobelle Carmody, which centre on the adventures of Glynn and Ember Flanders in a parallel universe.

Terms

Holder the king or ruler of all of Keltor, chosen by Darkfall.

Chieftain the ruler of a particular sept. The chieftaincy is inherited.

Mermod the chosen future Holder, by Darkfall.

Stranger the name given to those who come through Lanalor's portal from our world to Keltor.

Unraveller this is the believed hero, supposed to come to free the Unykorn or the Firstmade.

Shadowman a Robin Hood type figure, working for Darkfall and against any followers of the Draaka cult. The Shadowman and his agents are not endorsed by Darkfall, however.

Silfi are a deadly sort of sea serpent who infest the waters of Keltor, the sense the movement of the water and are attracted unless a wavespeaker is aboard (or awake) to calm the seas.

Septs
These are like the countries of Keltor. They are each distinctive, in what they produce, whether or not they cleave to Darkfall and the peoples who come from them. Also, each sept has their own specific talent.

Fomhika
Second largest island, with "immense tracts of pasture and crop lands" (p. 207) It is also tropical, hence the crops, etc. Fomhikans often have the ability to plantsing, enhancing their growth.

Acantha
Chieftain is Jurass; allied with the Draaka. Some Acanthans have the ability to levitate.

Myrmidor
"... half the size of Fomhika ... very mountainous"; there is a difference between those from Myrmidor and myrmidons, the protectors of soulweavers; however, many myrmidons are in fact originally from Myrmidor.

Darkfall
The smallest island, which is situated within Myrmidor's bay. This geographical situation suggests the protection of Darkfall by Myrmidor, just as myrmidons protect soulweavers. Described as a "tiny misty smudge" (p. 207)

Vespi
"... shaped like the head of a sickle", and closest island to Ramidan. Vespi owns and provides captains for all the ships in Keltor, as Vespians are the only ones able to 'wavespeak' a ship around the deadly silfi.

Ramidan
The second smallest island on Keltor. This is where the palace of the Holder is situated.

Iridom
The largest island, "more than ten times the size of Ramidan", with "a huge population" (p. 207).

Medicines and sweeteners, healing salves and poisons are predominantly manufactured on Iridom. As Feyt points out, the Iridom olfactors are too preoccupied with producing pleasure drugs and poisons to produce important medicines.

Sheanna Isles
The Sheanna isles are on basically the opposite side of Keltor to all the other islands. Little travel is done to Sheanna (for obvious reasons). Many Sheannites have the ability to visionweave.

Characters in Darkfall

Main
Glynn Flanders The main character of Darkfall. An incredibly strong character, able to look after herself alone, in a foreign world (whose people luckily enough speak her language) - she listens carefully to conversations around her. Her passion is to go on protecting the vulnerable Ember.

Her experiences as a girl provide her with the character to survive the trials of Keltor. Her mother never loved her, despite her athleticism and physical strength. She has long blonde hair and is physically different from Ember - the only similar physical characteristic is their "honey-coloured eyes" (p. 4).

The best student of the karate instructor, Wind, a young but wise Chinese man, Glynn has exceptional skill in tackling much stronger or experienced attackers. The two were in love, though Glynn's adoration for Wind was much more obvious. Wind eventually committed suicide, which Glynn never forgot or accepted.

Ember Flanders Delicate and physically beautiful with long red hair, Ember is a talented musician and the favourite daughter of her mother.

Due to her cancer fear enforced her emotional withdrawal from everything and everyone. Even her most treasured talent goes to waste when she starts selling her compositions to a modern rock band. She has neither the physical or emotional strength of Glynn, and thus it is fortunate that she is the one rescued by a soulweaver and her myrmidons.

Solen The Acanthan windwalker who dives into the water to save Glynn, as he is instructed from a dream. He is the brother of Hella and Flay, the latter of whom he brings to Darkfall, so she can offer herself as a soulweaver. He bears an uncanny resemblance Wind's features. Despite the heroisms of saving Glynn and bringing Flay to Darkfall, Solen displays some rather crude, uncaring qualities from time to time. He confuses Glynn, first falling into comfort around her, before becoming somewhat distant from her, and speaking dismissively of her at the wing hall.

It is only at the end that Glynn discovers Solen is an agent of the Shadowman, acting the drunken scoundrel in order to persuade his Draaka-following homeland that he is not a threat. Nema (the mother of Acanthan chieftain Jurass) admits disappointment due to Solen's shameful reputation. He has truly fallen in love with Glynn, and comes to her at the end in an attempt to help her.

Alene Soulweaver and past lover of Tarsin, the current Holder, before she became a soulweaver. She is not allowed to leave the Isle of Ramidan while Tarsin is Holder, although he orders she get out of his sight. She and her myrmidon protectors stay in a cabin away from the citadel until Ember arrives. She is gently spoken, wise and self-sacrificing.

Bleyd Eldest son of the Chieftain of Fomhika, Poverin, thus the heir to the Chieftain-ship of Fomhika, and protector of the Mermod, his brother Anyi. He takes an immediate interest in Ember, admiring her for her beauty. He has a pleasant personality, but is quite serious when it comes to the safety of his friends and especially Anyi. In addition, he is also very trustworthy - having the unconditional trust of Alene, Feyt and Tareed - clearly cleaving to Darkfall like his mother.

Tarsin The current Holder, born on Iridom, son of Coralyn - the Iridomi chieftain. He resides in the Citadel on the Isle of Ramidan. He neglects personal hygiene and is described as having rolls of fat and greasy skin and hair. He is seen as mad, though shows a quick intelligence. Holds an obvious grudge against Alene for choosing Darkfall over him, however he is fascinated with Ember, and especially grateful to her for saving his life.

Coralyn Chieftain of Iridom who schemes for a coup d'état to put her son Kalide on the throne by killing off her other son Tarsin whom she has no control over. She plans the bond of her stepdaughter Unys and Kerd, the son of the Chieftain of Vespi. Her actions are always out of self-interest; she is manipulative, sly and hateful to her enemies, but to those she wishes to keep on side, she is all charm, much like the Draaka during her speeches.

Minor
Kalide The sadistic younger son of Coralyn, who she wishes to place on the throne as Holder, since she can control him easily.

Asa Court emissary

Unys Coralyn's stepdaughter, whom she hopes to marry Kerd in order to ensure ties with Vespi. Despite Unys' obvious dislike for Kerd, she does not ever seem to dispute the arrangement.

Feyt The blonde myrmidon protector of Alene. Fierce in her loyalties and duties, and love for Alene. She is older and more experienced than her counterpart, Tareed, and in many ways wiser. She has no time for nonsense, and moves fast - especially in dangerous situations and ones that require fast thinking. She also has contacts with agents of the Shadowman, which Alene does not approve of.

Tareed The younger myrmidon, protector of Alene. It is Tareed who insists that Ember's arrival is a sign of the Unraveller coming. She is a little less experienced, however she holds an open mind about most things and displays a sort of childish compassion.

Draaka Leader of a cult growing in popularity due to its radical ideas but who actually worship the Chaos Spirit and commits animal and human sacrifices. The current Draaka is a woman and the cult's headquarters is a Haven outside the cave systems of Acantha. The title is similar to the planet Draakar which is also in Keltor's "Solar" system.

The Draaka is a smooth talker, silky, and quite charming. She manages to sound perfectly delightful, though in private she is scheming and though not quite as self-involved as Coralyn, her devotion to her master, Chaos, is her motive for everything she does.

Prime Second in charge at the Acanthan Haven and a cold and authoritative figure. Awakened Glynn from her drugged state during an accident with acidic candle wax.

Bayard The draakira who experiments with the feinna bond and Glynn, and is already herself bonded to the feinna. Bayard is very excited about those things in which she believes, most notably her scrolls, the feinna-link and her mistress and serving her mistress. Her actions are self-motivated, however, for she disobeys her mistress' desires in withholding Glynn's drugs in order to experiment with the feinna-link.

Jurass The Chieftain of Acantha and supporter of the Draaka; he welcomes the Draaka and her party as special guests. He was almost a mature adult when his father, Garad, travelled to Myrmidor for the choosing of the Holder of Keltor, and met and fell in love with a young soulweaver candidate Signe - who gave birth to Argon by Garad. This broke the life bond between Garad and Nema. He abdicated his rule, abandoned Nema and Jurass for Signe, but she continued to go through the Darkfall process. Garad died before Argon was born, but Jurass blames Argon for the loss.

He is "not famous for his abiding wisdom nor for his compassion", according to Solen (p. 57).

Nema Mother of Jurass. A very intelligent, blunt woman, and cleaves to Darkfall. She married Garad of Acantha, destined to be chieftain, because Garad's father admired her. They were joined in a life bond, unfortunately when Nema gave birth to Jurass it damaged her too much to ever give birth again - a blow for Garad who could not take any other woman due to the life bond.

Argon A white cloak of Eron isle, with the ability to weave (rare in men, except strangers), although in his conversation with Solen in the beginning of the book, he reveals his bitterness towards Darkfall. He is the half-brother of Jurass, and an exile. His father, Garad, died before he was born. His mother was a soulweaver, Signe, who was pregnant with him before she became a soulweaver, but had undergone the process before he was born. He was allowed to stay on Darkfall with her until the age of ten - the only man (of Keltor) to ever walk the isle. Hence his grudge against Darkfall.

Poverin The Chieftain of Fomhika, a fair man, quite liberal, who invites the Draaka to Fomhika, proving that he is open-minded. His apparent allowance for a haven on Fomhika and sending his soulweaver, Alandria, back to Darkfall, suggests something a little more, although this is hard to believe considering the position of his wife, daughter and all his sons but Gedron (assuming Torrid holds the same views as his other brothers).

Lady Maeve Poverin's "mate", who is quite firm in her beliefs and cleaves to Darkfall. She openly argues with the Draaka on Fomhika and leaves the celebrations along with her daughter, Rilka.

Gedron Son of Poverin, the Prime draakira on Fomhika. With completely differing views to the rest of his family. He is very much driven by his anger and frustration:

"Gedron thumped at the door again, a dark flush rising up the back of his neck." (p. 439 Darkfall)

Of course, this could also be seen as a sort of embarrassment on Gedron's part that the innkeeper won't answer the door for his esteemed guest. Especially after Bayard's comment.

Donard (Arolnhod Seminter) Bleyd's younger brother and a friend of Solen's, meets Glynn first on Acantha, waiting for Solen in his fell. He is suspicious of Glynn from the moment she tells him she is Fomhikan. They meet again on Fomhika, where Donard reveals his suspicions, but Glynn escapes.

Torrid The fourth brother of Poverin's sons, however he does not have much of a role at all, only making an appearance with his family at the welcoming of the Draaka.

Anyi The youngest son of Poverin, and the unlikely mermod. Though he is young, he is feisty, and as Bleyd would give all to protect him, so would he in order to protect Bleyd - or, for that matter, anyone who he holds dear - which is a long list.

Rilka The only daughter of Poverin and Maeve, she possesses the same allegiance as her mother and leaves with her after a debate with the Draaka.

Fulig Kerd's father and Chieftain of Vespi. The chieftaincy fell to him after Coralyn seduced his brother, Ranouf.

Kerd Son of the Vespian Chieftain, a very kind, compassionate character who truly loves Unys, despite her obvious rejections. Though he is in love, according to Alene, he "understands the need for Vespian neutrality" (p. 215). She also comments that he is "desperate to please", which explains the kindness he offers to everyone he meets.

Ranouf Uncle of Kerd; he was seduced by Coralyn who used his position as heir to the chieftaincy of Vespi, however Coralyn demanded he abandon his course for her, which he did. She did not realise that breaking the ship code meant he was now an exile and thus could never be chieftain.

Hella Solen's sister and a gemmeller, who befriends Glynn on Acantha and plans to escape with her until Glynn is captured. She is quite a delightful character, sending Glynn sether by way of greeting. Later, however, she is so enraged with what she believes to be betrayal on Glynn's part, she is harsh and rash.

Lev A man who Glynn meets in the minescrape, and becomes a good friend.

Wind Chung Ming Glynn's martial arts instructor who moved into the town of Quarry after inheriting a large sum of money. Glynn's first love. Committed suicide, leaving the notes: "I fall to the void, I drown".

Trivia
Ronaall is an anagram of Lanalor, but the manbeast's true identity is only revealed in Darksong.

External links
 

 
Australian fantasy novel series